Dikgang Phillip Makgalemele is a Botswanan politician who formerly served as a member of the Pan-African Parliament as well as the Parliament of Botswana representing Shoshong. He additionally served as the Minister of Youth Empowerment, Sport and Culture Development under President Mokgweetsi Masisi. He is a member of the Botswana Democratic Party.

References

Living people
Botswana Democratic Party politicians
Members of the Pan-African Parliament from Botswana
Youth ministers of Botswana
Year of birth missing (living people)